This is a list of Portuguese television related events from 2010.

Events
14 February - Filipe Pinto wins the third series of Ídolos.
3 October - The reality television show Secret Story debuts on TVI.
31 December - Sandra Pereira wins the fourth series of Ídolos, becoming the show's first female winner.

Debuts
3 October - Secret Story (2010–present)

Television shows

2000s
Ídolos (2003-2005, 2009–present)
Operação triunfo (2003-2010)

Ending this year

Births

Deaths